Bo'ao/Boao is a town located next to the eastern coastal city of Qionghai in Hainan Province, People's Republic of China, near the mouth of the Wanquan River where it discharges into the South China Sea. Bo'ao is famous for the Boao Forum for Asia, an international organisation whose venue is permanently located on Bo'ao's largest island, Dongyu Island.

Transportation

Bo'ao railway station serves this town.

Song about Bo'ao
In 2018, French singer Dantès Dailiang and  Chinese singer Eva release two songs in four languages (Chinese, Russian, French and English) and two music video clips about Bo'ao.

See also
Boao Forum for Asia

References

External links

Official website of Bo'ao government
 2013 IKA Kiteracing World Championships in Bo'ao

Populated places in Hainan